Will Smith (born 3 July 1992) is an Australian professional rugby league footballer who plays as a  and  for Wests Tigers in the National Rugby League.

He previously played for the Gold Coast Titans, Parramatta Eels and the Penrith Panthers in the NRL, Hull FC in the English Super League and the Indigenous All Stars.

Background
Smith was born in Newcastle, New South Wales, Australia and is an Indigenous Australian.

He played his junior football for the Western Suburbs Rosellas in the Newcastle Rugby League. He was then signed by the Newcastle Knights.

Playing career

Early career
From 2010 to 2012, Smith played for the Newcastle Knights' NYC team. On 28 May 2012, he re-signed with the Newcastle club on a one-year contract. 

In 2013, he moved on to Newcastle's New South Wales Cup team. On 25 June 2013, he signed a two-year contract with the Penrith Panthers starting in 2014.

2014
In Round 21 of the 2014 NRL season, Smith made his NRL debut for the Penrith club against Canterbury-Bankstown replacing the injured Peter Wallace. He would go on to play eight games for the Penrith club at five-eighth that year, including two games in the finals. On 21 September, he was named at five-eighth in the 2014 New South Wales Cup Team of the Year.

2015
On 31 January and 1 February 2015, Smith played for Penrith in the 2015 NRL Auckland Nines. He finished off the season playing nine games for the Penrith club scoring two tries and kicking four goals.

2016
On 13 February, Smith played for the Indigenous All Stars against the World All Stars. He was named in the Penrith 2016 NRL Auckland Nines squad.

In November, it was announced that he would be joining the Parramatta Eels in 2017.

2017
Smith made his club debut for Parramatta in round 9 of the 2017 season, playing at five-eighth against the North Queensland Cowboys and scoring a try. On 5 July 2017, Smith resigned with the club on a one-year extension due to good form. With Clint Gutherson and Bevan French injured, Smith moved to fullback and the end of the season, and finished the year of strongly playing 15 games (including two finals) and scoring six tries.  In the elimination final match against the North Queensland Cowboys, Smith went from hero to villain in the space of 80 minutes.  In the first half, Smith scored a length of the field try to make the score 10-6 at half time to Parramatta.  In the second half, North Queensland playmaker Michael Morgan put up a routine bomb, in the resulting play Smith allowed the ball to bounce and did not attempt to catch it.  Smith grabbed the ball on the second bounce but North Queensland player John Asiata raced up behind and stole the ball off Smith to score.  This changed the momentum of the match and North Queensland went on to win 24-16.

2018
Smith made his first start for Parramatta in round 2 of the 2018 season where they were beaten 54-0 by Manly.  On 28 June, Parramatta who were in last place almost managed to pull off one of the upsets of the season when they were leading 18-8 with 7 minutes left to play.  In the resulting minutes, Smith threw a forward pass and then in another play attempted a 40/20 kick which went out on the full, thus, giving the ball back to St George and in the next Saints attacking spell they crossed for the match winning try to win 20-18.
After spending the next few weeks in reserve grade, Smith was recalled to the Parramatta side against St George in which Parramatta won the match 40-4 with Smith coming off the bench.

2019
Smith played in Parramatta's 20-12 opening round victory over Penrith.  Smith was subsequently demoted to reserve grade where he spent the next 2 months.  On 14 May, Smith was recalled to the Parramatta side at the expense of Jaeman Salmon who was demoted by coach Brad Arthur after the club were defeated by Melbourne 64-10 at Suncorp Stadium.

Smith made his return to the Parramatta side in Round 10 against North Queensland which ended in a 17-10 loss.  Following the club's 42-22 loss against Cronulla in Round 13, Smith was demoted to reserve grade by Brad Arthur and replaced with Jaeman Salmon.

2020
In round 18 of the 2020 NRL season, Smith played his first game for Parramatta in nearly 15 months against Penrith which they lost 20-2 at Penrith Park.

In round 20 against the Wests Tigers, Parramatta won the match 28-24, Smith scored the winning try for Parramatta which ensured they would finish third on the table and finish inside the top four granting the club two chances in the finals series.

In November, he signed a one-year contract extension to remain at Parramatta for the 2021 season.

2021
Smith played a total of 17 games for Parramatta in the 2021 NRL season including both finals matches.  Parramatta were eliminated from the competition at the semi-final stage, this time losing to Penrith 8-6 in the lowest scoring match of the year.

On 15 October, Smith signed a two-year deal to join the Gold Coast starting in the 2022 season.

2022
In round 1 of the 2022 NRL season, Smith made his club debut for the Gold Coast against his former club Parramatta.  Parramatta would go on to win the match 32-28.
On 3 June, Smith was released by the Gold Coast club.  Smith had requested the release on compassionate grounds.

On 20 July, Smith signed a short term contract to join Super League side Hull F.C. until the end of the 2022 season. On 7 November, it was announced that Smith had signed a train and trial contract with the Wests Tigers for the 2023 NRL Preseason.

References

External links

Parramatta Eels profile
Eels profile

1992 births
Living people
Australian rugby league players
Hull F.C. players
Indigenous All Stars players
Indigenous Australian rugby league players
Penrith Panthers players
Parramatta Eels players
Gold Coast Titans players
Rugby league centres
Rugby league five-eighths
Rugby league fullbacks
Rugby league players from Newcastle, New South Wales
Wentworthville Magpies players
Western Suburbs Magpies NSW Cup players
Western Suburbs Rosellas players